Julio Alberto Barroso (born 16 January 1985 in San Martín, Argentina) is an Argentine-born Chilean football defender currently playing for Everton. He was nationalised as a Chilean so as to free up a spot as an international player for his club.

Career

Argentina, Spain and Ñublense
Barroso has played for a number of teams in his early years, like Argentinos Juniors, Boca Juniors, Racing Club, Estudiantes, including a spell in Spain with Lorca and his first experience in Chile with Ñublense.

Barroso was part of the Argentina under-20 team that won the FIFA World Youth Championship in 2005.

O'Higgins
On 2012, Barroso is signed for O'Higgins from Ñublense. In 2012, he was runner-up with O'Higgins, after lose the final against Universidad de Chile in the penalty shoot-out.

In 2013, he won the Apertura 2013-14 with O'Higgins. In the tournament, he played in 16 of 18 matches, and scored one goal in the match that finished 4:3 against Rangers de Talca.

Colo-Colo

For the Clausura 2013-14, Barroso is signed for Colo-Colo for a US$1.1M fee.

In August 2014, it was reported that the Football Federation of Chile had approached the player with a view to representing the Chile national football team, but it was found he was ineligible due his participation at the 2005 FIFA World Cup Youth Championship prior to gaining citizenship.

Honours

Club
Boca Juniors
Primera División Argentina (1): 2008 Apertura
O'Higgins
Primera División de Chile (1): 2013 Apertura
Colo-Colo
Primera División de Chile (3): 2014–C, 2015–A, Transición 2017
 Copa Chile (1): 2016
Supercopa de Chile (2): 2017, 2018

Individual
O'Higgins
Medalla Santa Cruz de Triana: 2014

International
FIFA World Youth Championship
FIFA World Youth Championship: 2005

References

External links
 Argentine Primera statistics
 Football-Lineups player profile

1985 births
Living people
People from San Martín, Buenos Aires
Argentine footballers
Argentina under-20 international footballers
Argentine expatriate footballers
Argentine expatriate sportspeople in Spain
Association football defenders
Argentinos Juniors footballers
Boca Juniors footballers
Racing Club de Avellaneda footballers
Lorca Deportiva CF footballers
Estudiantes de La Plata footballers
Ñublense footballers
Colo-Colo footballers
O'Higgins F.C. footballers
Chilean Primera División players
Argentine Primera División players
Expatriate footballers in Chile
Expatriate footballers in Spain
Naturalized citizens of Chile
Sportspeople from Buenos Aires Province